The MV Summit Venture was a bulk carrier which is best known for colliding into the  Sunshine Skyway Bridge in 1980. It was built in 1976 by Oshima Shipbuilding Co. of Nagasaki, Japan.

After being repaired from colliding into the Sunshine skyway bridge it had several different owners. It sank off the Vietnamese coast in 2010 under the name of Jian Mao 9.

1980 incident

Summit Venture was involved in a fatal collision with the original Sunshine Skyway Bridge in Tampa Bay on May 9, 1980. While negotiating a required turn in the narrow channel during a storm, the radar failed, and the freighter struck one of the piers on the southbound span of the bridge. A  section of the steel cantilever highway bridge collapsed, causing a Greyhound bus, a truck, and six other vehicles to fall  into the bay. Thirty-five people died.

That day the pilot of Summit Venture was John E. Lerro. He was cleared of wrongdoing by both a state grand jury and a Coast Guard investigation.  In 2016 the book titled Skyway: The True Story of Tampa Bay's Signature Bridge and the Man Who Brought It Down shed new light on what transpired on the day of the accident. Although Capt. Lerro resumed his shipping duties soon afterward, he was forced to retire months later by the onset of multiple sclerosis, dying from complications caused by the disease on August 31, 2002, at the age of 59.

Wesley MacIntire was the only person who survived the fall. His truck fell off the bridge but bounced off the bow of Summit Venture before falling into Tampa Bay. He was pulled from the water by the ship's crew. Physically, MacIntire only suffered from a cut on the head and water in his lungs. He sued the company that owned the ship and settled for $175,000 in 1984. He died in 1989 of bone cancer at the age of 65, always regretting being the sole survivor among those who fell. Each year he drove to the bridge on the accident's anniversary and saluted those who did not survive.

A new bridge was completed in 1987 to replace the old one. Several safeguards were included in the design to prevent a repeat occurrence of the Summit Venture incident, such as the installation of massive concrete bumpers or "dolphins" around the main span's piers to mitigate collisions.

Return to service and subsequent demise
Summit Venture had her hull repaired and continued service under the same name. It went to Tampa for the last time in September 1990 to be inspected by the US Coast Guard. It was sold by its original owner Hercules Carriers from Monrovia, Liberia to Endeavor Shipping, a Greek company, in November 1993 being rechristened to Sailor I which mostly worked along the US West Coast. It was sold again in May 2004 to Frontier Shipping Inc from Singapore. After being sold it was renamed to KS Harmony and flew a Panamanian flag servicing the Caribbean Sea. It sank off the Vietnamese coast in 2010 under the name of Jian Mao 9. All 26 crew members on board were rescued by a container ship, Nyk Aquarius.

References

1980 in the United States
Maritime incidents in 1980
Merchant ships of the United States